Les impressionnistes (Impressionists) is an educational video game released in 1997. The game focused on was developed by the French developer Index+ as a co-production with Réunion des Musées Nationaux.

The game was developed by Claire Barbillon from an idea from the Museum of Orsay, using QuickTime technology. It features 200 works of art from 45 artists. André Dussollier narrates.

References

External links 
 Impressionists at Microïds

Windows games
Classic Mac OS games
1997 video games
History educational video games
Microïds games
Video games developed in France